Dean Podgornik (born 3 July 1979, in Nova Gorica) is a former Slovenian cyclist.

Palmares

2001
1st Stage 3 Tour of Slovenia 
2002
2nd Overall Tour of Slovenia 
1st Stage 2b (ITT)
2003
1st Stage 8 Olympia's Tour
1st Stage 3a Tour de Serbie
3rd Poreč Trophy
3rd National Time Trial Championships
2004
1st  National Time Trial Championships
2005
2nd Veenendaal–Veenendaal
3rd National Time Trial Championships
2010
1st Overall Tour du Maroc
1st Stages 1 & 4

References

1979 births
Living people
Slovenian male cyclists
People from Nova Gorica